96 °C Café (Chinese: 96 °C 咖啡) is MediaCorp's first transmedia project related to coffee and romance. It was broadcast from 29 April to 24 May 2013 on free-to-air channel MediaCorp Channel 8 and consists of 20 episodes. It stars Desmond Tan, Julie Tan, Tay Ping Hui, Romeo Tan, Chris Tong and Ian Fang as the main casts of the series. Prior to the drama serial, prequels of two webisodes each week were released on xinfirst's portal progressively, for a period of four weeks, Mondays from 18 February to 11 March 2013.

It was one of the two lowest-rated drama series at 9pm, with the other being Sudden.

Cast

Overseas broadcast
This would be the third Singaporean drama after the Unriddle series to be telecast on ntv7's primetime slot.

Awards and nominations

Star Awards 2014
96 °C Café garnered 4 nominations for 3 awards in the Star Awards 2014, for Best Theme Song, Best Drama Serial and London Choco Roll Happiness Award. The other dramas nominated for Best Drama Series and Best Theme Songs are The Dream Makers , C.L.I.F. 2 , Beyond (2012 TV series) & The Journey: A Voyage

See also
 List of 96°C Café episodes
 List of MediaCorp Channel 8 Chinese Drama Series (2010s)

References

2013 Singaporean television series debuts
2013 Singaporean television series endings
Channel 8 (Singapore) original programming